Crane's View is a trilogy of novels written by American author Jonathan Carroll from 1997 to 2001, published by Nan A. Talese/Doubleday. The books received reviews that ranged from average to good.

Reception
Charles de Lint praised The Marriage of Sticks as "classic Carroll: witty, wise, strange, elusive, immediate", declaring that "it also continues his recent trend of producing endings as satisfying as one could hope for from the quality of how the novels begin and the stories build."

Books in the series
Kissing The Beehive (late December 1997): When the novel was published in Great Britain the following year, Carroll added a three-page epilogue at the request of its publisher, Victor Gollancz. Director David Lynch once expressed an interest in directing a film version of the novel.  Kissing the Beehive was nominated for the British Fantasy Award in 1999. The novel received renewed attention in early 2008, when Kissing the Beehive was announced as a tentative title for the second studio album by Canadian indie rock band Wolf Parade. After the existence of Carroll's book was pointed out to the band, the band retracted the title rather than risking a copyright infringement issue. Wolf Parade vocalist Spencer Krug said the band "didn't know that was the title of a book... We might have to change it, but we might not. And we'll have to make it clear that it's not [named] after his book. It's a complicated situation." The album's title was eventually announced as At Mount Zoomer, although it does include a song titled "Kissing the Beehive".
The Marriage of Sticks (2000): it tells the story of the relationship between Miranda, who has a successful career and lonely life, and the already-married Hugh. Miranda sees visions and strangers whom she feels she knows. In the end, Miranda has to face herself and her actions.
The Wooden Sea (2001): a New York Times Notable Book.

References

External links
 Kissing the Beehive
 SF Site review of Kissing the Beehive
 Kissing the Beehive at Worlds Without End

Novel series
Fantasy novel trilogies